The Lancefield Coachworks Limited was a builder of bespoke bodies for expensive car chassis always introducing sporting elements into designs. Lancefield operated as coachbuilders from 1921 to 1948 then switched their business to aircraft components which had been their wartime activity. They were based in London at Wrenfield Place, Herries Street, Queen's Park, W10.

Foundation
Initially known as Gaisford & Warboys they worked from Lancefield Street in Queen's Park then on moving to nearby Beethoven Street changed their business's name to Lancefield Coachworks later incorporating a company of that same name.

Personnel
Gaisford brothers, alumni of Grosvenor Carriage Company a part of the Shaw & Kilburn group of General Motors dealers.
Harry, Edwin and Bob Gaisford and George Warboys.

Jock Betteridge, head designer, also from Grosvenor.

Chassis clothed
 Rolls-Royce - more than 150
 Bentley
 Weymann bodies on Stutz chassis
 Isotta Fraschini
 Daimler In both the 1948 and 1949 London Motor Shows Lancefield displayed Daimler Straight-Eight limousines specially equipped with a full length stretcher and extensive medical equipment to carry an invalid and they were awarded a Silver Gilt medal. The vehicles are fully described by Brian E Smith in his book, The Daimler Tradition.

Aircraft components
Exhaust manifolds and other pipework including gas turbine tailpipes; cowlings and other presswork; alloy seats and harnesses.

Sources
Bonham's Auctions accessed 26 March 2013
RM Auctions accessed 26 March 2013

References

External links

 1930 Cadillac V16 by Lancefield
 1930 Stutz by Lancefield
 1938 Buick Special Model 44 Lancefield drophead coupé

Lancefield
Manufacturing companies based in London
Vehicle manufacture in London
Vehicle manufacturing companies established in 1921